Sonsini is a surname. Notable people with the surname include: 

John Sonsini (born 1950), American artist
Larry Sonsini (born  1941), American lawyer